Scott James Mean (born 13 December 1973) is an English former footballer who played as a midfielder. After retiring from football he turned his hand to acting.

Playing career
Born in Crawley, Mean began his career with Bournemouth, playing 74 Second Division games under the stewardship of Tony Pulis and Mel Machin over the course of the 1992–93, 1993–94 and 1994–95 seasons. His form and potential earned him a £100,000 move to Premiership side West Ham United in November 1996. Highly rated at Upton Park, he was seen as having a promising career ahead of him at the top level. To aid in his development he was loaned out to John Rudge's First Division Port Vale at the start of the 1998–99 season. However, just 80 minutes into his Vale debut he suffered a knee injury that would virtually end his career as a professional footballer. Quickly returning to Upton Park, he recovered to play again, but not to the same level as he once had seemed destined to.

In the summer of 1999 he returned to previous club Bournemouth on a free transfer, back in the Second Division. He played regular football in the 1999–2000 season, scoring on his return to Dean Court on 7 August in a 2–1 win over Cambridge United. Despite playing 40 competitive games he was released in May 2000. Not in demand the next season in the Football League, he dropped down to the Conference with Kingstonian. He played two games for the "K's" in October 2000, both were away defeats, both saw Mean receiving yellow cards. Before the month was out he had joined Crawley Town in the Southern Football League. His professional days long over and by May 2007 he was only competing in pub football.

Style of play
Mean was described by BBC journalist Tom Fordyce as having "dashing good looks, very ordinary skills",

Acting career
After his footballing career was cut short, Mean decided to become an actor, and appeared in two football related productions. He played the England footballer "Parksey" alongside Ricky Tomlinson in the Mike Bassett: England Manager film before a stint in Sky1 series Dream Team, playing Robbie Walsh. He has also made appearances in various TV shows, most notably; The Bill and EastEnders.

Career statistics
Source:

References

External links
 

1973 births
Living people
English footballers
People from Crawley
Sportspeople from Crawley
Footballers from West Sussex
Association football midfielders
AFC Bournemouth players
West Ham United F.C. players
Port Vale F.C. players
Kingstonian F.C. players
Crawley Town F.C. players
Premier League players
English Football League players
National League (English football) players
Southern Football League players
English male film actors
English male soap opera actors